Dirt Rag was a mountain bike magazine based out of Pittsburgh, Pennsylvania. The magazine covered many aspects of mountain-bike culture. It was in circulation between 1989 and January 2020.

Unique features
Founded in 1989, Dirt Rag was an independently owned mountain bike magazine that enjoyed worldwide distribution. The magazine focused on mountain bikes and their riders, but it also embraced all aspects of bicycle culture. The magazine was known for thorough and honest product reviews, a unique perspective on cycling, and original bicycle-related literature and art.

Dirt Rag celebrated a grassroots connection to its readers and coverage of neglected niches of the bicycle world.

Publishing facts
 Dirt Rag was originally published seven times per year, but was reduced to four issues in its final year of publuication. 
 In 2012, Dirt Rag founded a new parent company, Rotating Mass Media, to oversee the Dirt Rag brand and the Dirt Fest mountain bike festivals. 
 Founders Maurice and Elaine Tierney were elected to the Mountain Bike Hall of Fame in 2002.
 On January 30, 2020, Dirt Rag announced they would be "shutting its doors and ceasing all operations, including the website and Dirt Fest."

References

External links
 The Dirt Rag Official Website

1989 establishments in Pennsylvania
2020 disestablishments in Pennsylvania
Quarterly magazines published in the United States
Sports magazines published in the United States
Defunct magazines published in the United States
Independent magazines
Magazines established in 1989
Magazines disestablished in 2020
Magazines published in Pittsburgh
Mountain biking magazines